The 2001 AAPT Championships was a men's ATP tennis tournament played on outdoor hard courts at the Memorial Drive Park in Adelaide in Australia and was part of the International Series of the 2001 ATP Tour. It was the 24th edition of the tournament and ran from 1 through 7 January 2001. Tommy Haas won the singles title.

Finals

Singles

 Tommy Haas defeated  Nicolás Massú 6–3, 6–1
 It was Haas' 1st title of the year and the 2nd of his career.

Doubles

 David Macpherson /  Grant Stafford defeated  Wayne Arthurs /  Todd Woodbridge 6–7(5–7), 6–4, 6–4
 It was Macpherson's 1st title of the year and the 14th of his career. It was Stafford's only title of the year and the 5th of his career.

Entrants

Seeds

 Rankings are as of 25 December 2000.

Other entrants
The following players received wildcards into the singles main draw:
  Lleyton Hewitt
  Luke Smith
  Todd Woodbridge

The following players received entry from the qualifying draw:

  Björn Phau
  Xavier Malisse
  Alun Jones
  Michael Kohlmann

External links
 ATP Tournament profile
 ITF tournament details

AAPT Championships
Next Generation Adelaide International
App
2000s in Adelaide
January 2001 sports events in Australia